Hristo Ivanov (born 6 April 1982) is a Bulgarian former professional footballer who played as a goalkeeper.

Ivanov previously played for Spartak Pleven, Vidima-Rakovski Sevlievo, Lokomotiv Mezdra, Botev Plovdiv, Montana and Oborishte.

International career
In August 2019, Ivanov was called up by Krasimir Balakov to the Bulgarian national team for the Euro 2020 qualifier against England and friendly match against Republic of Ireland. An unused substitute against England, he made his debut against Ireland on 10 September 2019 at the Aviva Stadium, Dublin, making him, at 37 years, 5 months and 4 days, the oldest Bulgaria debutant.

References

External links

 

Bulgarian footballers
Bulgaria international footballers
1982 births
Living people
First Professional Football League (Bulgaria) players
PFC Spartak Pleven players
PFC Vidima-Rakovski Sevlievo players
PFC Lokomotiv Mezdra players
FC Montana players
Botev Plovdiv players
FC Oborishte players
SFC Etar Veliko Tarnovo players
Association football goalkeepers
Sportspeople from Pleven